Her Husband's Friend is a 1920 American silent drama film directed by Fred Niblo starring Enid Bennett. A copy of the film is preserved at the Library of Congress.

Plot
Princeton Hadley (Chatterton), because of favors done during his college days by Billy Westover (Lee), feels a moral obligation upon Billy's sudden death in an automobile accident to hold to the responsibility of paying the widow's alimony to Judith (Bennett) as her husband's bondsman, even though the law does not require this. Shortly before his death, Billy had been divorced from his wife and had lost his fortune. Later, Princeton meets the widow without knowing her identity and falls in love with her. Judith is revealed when the two are brought before their lawyer, and Princeton convinces her that he wishes to continue his obligation as her husband.

Cast
 Enid Bennett as Judith Westover
 Rowland V. Lee as Billy Westover (credited as Roland Lee)
 Tom Chatterton as Princeton Hadley
 Mae Busch as Clarice
 Aileen Manning as Dr. Henrietta Carter
 George C. Pearce as Dr. Ogilvy (credited as George Pierce)
 Robert Dunbar as John Morton

References

External links

1920 films
1920 drama films
Silent American drama films
American silent feature films
American black-and-white films
Films directed by Fred Niblo
1920s American films